Yassine Tekfaoui (born 17 October 2001) is a Dutch footballer who plays as a forward for IJsselmeervogels.

Playing career
After being named talent of the year at his hometown club CJVV Amersfoort in 2016, Tekfaoui joined the IJsselmeervogels academy later that year. He regularly trained with the first team and even made his unofficial debut at the age of 15 in September 2017, appearing as a member of the starting lineup during a friendly against Magreb '90.

He made the switch to Utrecht in the summer of 2018, initially joining their under-19 team. After playing limited minutes off the bench in his first season, he had a breakout start to the 2019–20 season. He made his professional debut with Utrecht's reserve team Jong Utrecht on 6 December 2019, coming on for Hicham Acheffay in the final minutes of a 1–1 draw with MVV Maastricht. A few weeks later he signed his first professional deal with Utrecht.

On 31 August 2021, he terminated his contract with Utrecht by mutual consent and returned to IJsselmeervogels for the 2021–22 season.

Career statistics

Club

Notes

References

External links
 
 

2001 births
Dutch sportspeople of Moroccan descent
Sportspeople from Amersfoort
Living people
Dutch footballers
Association football forwards
IJsselmeervogels players
FC Utrecht players
Jong FC Utrecht players
Eerste Divisie players
Tweede Divisie players
Footballers from Utrecht (province)